Rhabdosphaeraceae is a family of algae belonging to the order Syracosphaerales.

Genera
The following is a list of Rhabdosphaeraceae genera:
 Acanthoica Lohmann, 1903
 Algirosphaera Schlauder, 1945
 Amitha Shafik, 1989
 Anacanthoica G. Deflandre, 1952 
 Anthosphaera 
 Blackites W.W. Hay & K.M. Towe, 1962 
 Cepekiella P.H. Roth, 1970 
 Cruxia O. Varol, 1989 
 Cyrtosphaera A. Kleijne, 1992 
 Discosphaera Haeckel, 1894 
 Discoturbella P.H. Roth, 1970 
 Naninfula K. Perch-Nielsen, 1968 
 Notiocyrtolithus Shafik, 1989 
 Ommatolithus Shafik, 1989 
 Palusphaera Lecal, 1966 
 Pseudorhabdosphaera Lecel & Bernheim, 1960 
 Pseudotriquetrorhabdulus S.W. Wise, 1976 
 Rhabdolithes O. Schmidt, 1870 
 Solisphaera J. Bollmann, M.Y. Cortés, A. Kleijne, J.B. Østerogaard, & J.R. Young, 2006

References

Algae
Haptophyte families